Boyboy or Boy-Boy or variant, may refer to:

Places
 Boyboy, Piddig, Ilocos Norte, Philippines; a district of Piddig

People
 Boyboy, a Filipino surname
 Boyboy, a stagename for New Zealand singer-songwriter Sam McCarthy
 Boy-Boy Mosia (1985-2016) a South African soccer player
 Boy Boy Martin (born 1984) a Jamaican-Dutch kickboxer

Fictional characters
 Boy-Boy (aka Boyboy, Boy Boy), a character from the Singaporean TV show Hero (2016 TV series)
 BoyBoy, a character from the 1973 Toni Morrison novel Sula (novel)
 BoyBoy, a superhero from the animated TV show The Ripping Friends

Other uses
 Boyboy Festival (Burgos, La Union, Philippines); a feeder beauty pageant to Miss La Union
 Boy Boy, a channel on YouTube run by Aleksa Vulovic and Alex Apollonov

See also

 Boy (disambiguation)
 Boy, Boy, Boy (song) 2007 song off the album Oblivion with Bells by Underworld
 Boy Oh Boy (disambiguation)
 Boys Boys Boys (disambiguation)